Gafsa Governorate is one of the 24 governorates of Tunisia. It is situated in central Tunisia, bordering Algeria. It covers an area of 7807 km2 and has a population of 337,331 (2014 census). The capital of the city is Gafsa - ruled by Nader Hamdouni - whom all the heads of local municipalities report to.

Geography 

The average temperature is 19.8 °C and annual rainfall is 48.9 millimeters.

Gafsa is a noted irrigated fruit-growing oasis and a major shipping center for phosphates obtained from the salt flats of Chott el Djerid (Arabic: شط الجريد Šoṭṭ el-Jarīd). It is connected to the port of Sfax (Ṣafāqis) by road and rail. (Ijtihed Kilani)

Administrative divisions
Administratively, the governorate is divided into eleven delegations (mutamadiyat), eight municipalities, nine rural councils, and 76 sectors (imadas). The delegations and their populations from the 2004 and 2014 censuses, are listed below:

The following eight municipalities are located in Gafsa Governorate:

References

 
Governorates of Tunisia